
Bastible is a restaurant in southern Dublin, Ireland. It was awarded a Michelin star in 2022.

Location
Bastible is located at Leonard's corner in Portobello, at the junction of the South Circular Road and Clanbrassil Street.

History
The restaurant's name is derived from bastible, a three-legged iron pot that stood over an open fire in a traditional Irish kitchen; it was an alternative to an oven and was used to bake bread.

Bastible was opened by Barry FitzGerald and ClareMarie Thomas in November 2015.

It received a Michelin star for the first time in 2022. According to the Guide Michelin, "The modern set menu features top class Irish ingredients at the height of season and each main ingredient is given the space to shine. Dishes are stripped-back, flavours are bold, and servings are generous: this is cooking that comes from the heart."

Awards
 Michelin star: 2022

See also
List of Michelin starred restaurants in Ireland

References

External links

Restaurants in Dublin (city)
2015 establishments in Ireland
Michelin Guide starred restaurants in Ireland
Restaurants established in 2015